McLynn is a surname. Notable people with the surname include:

Frank McLynn (born 1941), British writer, historian and journalist
Pauline McLynn (born 1962), Irish actor, comedian and writer

See also
McGlynn